Pennsylvania Route 208 (PA 208) is located in Western Pennsylvania; its western terminus just west of the village of New Bedford in Lawrence County (11.5 miles northwest of New Castle) at U.S. Route 422 (US 422) and the Ohio state line.

Route description

The route begins in Lawrence County where US 422 meets the Ohio state line; PA 208 heads east-northeastward to the village of New Bedford about a mile from the state line. The route junctions with the former PA 932 in the village and was the former alignment of US 422 from the state line to this point, where the old alignment turned southeast; PA 208 continues eastward here. About  later, it is joined by PA 551 and the concurrency turns northward for about  before turning east again as it crosses the Shenango River and enters the village of Pulaski. The concurrency ends  later, and PA 208 continues another  to its interchange with Interstate 376 (I-376). From here, the route heads into a rural area of northern Lawrence County that is home to an Amish community. In the borough, PA 158 joins briefly, and then leaves the route at the northern terminus of PA 956.

As PA 208 enters Mercer County, it turns east-northeast and meets US 19 at the village of Leesburg about  later. The routes briefly overlap northward, and then PA 208 continues east-northeastward. About  from Leesburg, the route is joined by PA 258 north of the Grove City Premium Outlets, and the concurrency then interchanges with I-79 (exit 113) immediately thereafter. The concurrency ends  later at the village of London – prior to the interstate, this was a simple junction between PA 208 and PA 258. Another  later, the concurrency ends, and PA 208 continues eastward, leaves the borough, and meets the county line  later.

PA 208 enters Venango County, and  later intersects with PA 8 in the borough of Barkeyville. The route continues eastward  where it passes over I-80 before entering the borough of Clintonville  later; here the route intersects with PA 308. The concurrency meets the northern terminus of PA 268 about  later in the borough, and turns north to cross the Allegheny River. The concurrency turns east at the center of the town, then crosses into Clarion County  later, winding northward, eastward, and finally east-northeastward, crossing back into Venango County again  later. The concurrency meets the northern terminus of PA 478  later; just south of this intersection, PA 478 has a partial interchange with I-80 (exit 45) for traffic exiting or entering eastbound. The westbound interchange ramps are 0.3 eastward on the PA 38/PA 208 concurrency, which continues northeasterly to the county line  later.

After crossing into Clarion County a second and final time, the PA 38/PA 208 concurrency continues north-northeastward  before its northern terminus. Continuing east-northeast, the route travels  to the borough of Shippenville, where it meets US 322. The two routes overlap for  eastward, where PA 208 turns north, traveling  to the village of Fryburg.

History

1926-1948 – segment from the Ohio state line to New Bedford was designated US 422.
1928 – signed PA 208 from Barkeyville to west of Emlenton.
1928-1929 – segment from Pulaski to New Wilmington was designated PA 218.
1932-1936 – segment from Volant to Leesburg was designated PA 956.
1936 – western terminus of PA 208 moved from Barkeyville to PA 158 via Leesburg Station Rd.
1936-1959 – segment from Volant to Leesburg was changed to PA 168.
1926-1948 – segment from the Ohio state line to Pulaski was designated PA 278.
1928-1959 – segment from Mariasville to Shippenville was designated PA 238.
1929-1959 – segment from Pulaski to Volant was designated PA 278.
1927-1968 – segment from Shippenville to Frills Cors was designated PA 66.
1959 – western terminus of PA 208 moved to its current location, and eastern terminus was moved from PA 38 west of Emlenton to Shippenville.
1968 – eastern terminus of PA 208 moved to its current location.

Major intersections

PA 208 Truck

Pennsylvania Route 208 Truck was a truck route around a weight-restricted bridge over the Doe Creek on which trucks over 20 tons and combination loads over 26 tons were prohibited.  The route followed US 422 and PA 551.  The route was signed in 2013. All weight restricted bridges on the stretch of PA 208 were rebuilt in 2017 and 2018, resulting in the deletion of the route.

See also

References

External links

Pennsylvania Highways: PA 208

208
Transportation in Lawrence County, Pennsylvania
Transportation in Mercer County, Pennsylvania
Transportation in Venango County, Pennsylvania
Transportation in Clarion County, Pennsylvania